Sandra L. Kurtzig is an American businesswoman and technology entrepreneur. She was one of Silicon Valley's first female entrepreneurs, and as the founder of the business and manufacturing software producer ASK Group in 1972, was the first woman to take a Silicon Valley technology company public.

Career

Early life
Sandra Kurtzig was born in Chicago on October 21, 1947. Kurtzig earned a bachelor's degree in mathematics from University of California, Los Angeles in 1968, and a master's degree in aeronautical engineering at Stanford University.

Contract programming
In 1972, she left her job selling computer time-sharing for General Electric and devoted more of her time to starting a family. She founded ASK Group as a part-time job, using "a $2,000 commission check from GE;" the $2,000 was needed to rent a time-sharing terminal. Kurtzig launched ASK as a small, part-time contract software-programming business out of her second bedroom "to keep her mind occupied" and increase her income, never intending the business to operate outside her house. She was asked by her first client, Halcyon, to create an inventory-tracking program that could efficiently provide manufacturing information. Realizing that other manufacturers might find such a program useful, she recruited several graduates with degrees in engineering and computers. Under her direction they wrote standardized applications that addressed problems faced by local manufacturers.

ERP

Manman

Kurtzig reinvested all profits into growing the company. Her company required access to minicomputers and she persuaded employees at a nearby Hewlett-Packard plant to allow her company to use one of the company's HP 3000  minicomputers outside of normal working hours. By 1978, ASK released a package of programs called Manman, one of the first enterprise resource planning (ERP) software suites. She later concluded a deal for Hewlett Packard to sell Manman for use on HP-3000 minicomputers, at a time when most ERP software was only available to run on more expensive mainframe computers. The company went public on NASDAQ in 1981, and in 1983, Kurtzig's personal stake in the ASK Group was worth $67 million.  She resigned from her role of CEO of the ASK Group in 1985. but returned in 1989 to refocus and once again grow the company. ASK bought Ingres Corporation in November 1990. At its peak, the company's annual sales were just under $1 billion U.S. dollars.

Kenandy

In 2010 she founded the enterprise management software company Kenandy, where she served as the CEO through 2015 and is currently the Chairman. Kenandy specializes in producing cloud ERP solutions for manufacturing businesses. Kenandy is named after Kurtzig's sons, Ken and Andy Kurtzig, who are serving as CEOs at other tech businesses. In June 2013, Kenandy announced a $33 million round of funding led by Lightspeed Venture Partners. valuing the company at $350 million.  Other investors are Kleiner Perkins Caufield and Byers, salesforce.com, and WSGR (Wilson, Sonsini, Goodrich and Rosati).

Kurtzig's autobiography, CEO: Building a $400 Million Company from the Ground Up was published by Harvard Business Press.

Personal
When Kurtzig was awarded the Wall Street Transcript's Bronze Award and was shortly thereafter "profiled in The Wall Street Journal, The New York Times, and The Washington Post," she said "It's fun to clip articles and send them to your mother, but ASK is really a team."

Her former husband's name was Arie, and their sons Ken and Andy Kurtzig were born c. 1973 and 1976; their parents divorced when the boys were 12 and 9.

Her father's name was Barney Brody. Her mother "Marian (Boruck) Brody came from a wealthy Chicago family, graduated from the University of Illinois, and worked for a time as a police reporter in Chicago."

See also
 Pearl.com (company founded by son Andy Kurtzig)

References

External links
Kenandy

American business executives
American women company founders
American company founders
Technology company founders
Living people
University of California, Los Angeles alumni
Stanford University School of Engineering alumni
1947 births
21st-century American women